Soulidifly Productions is an American media company founded by retired Verizon Communications executive and film producer BK Fulton in 2017. It is a film-making, streaming media, media investment, and book and e-magazine publishing company based in Richmond, Virginia.

History
In 2017 B. Keith “BK” Fulton founded independent film company Soulidifly Productions. Their films tend to focus on multiethnic and multigenerational stories.

American filmmaker Monty Ross serves as the President of Film & Production.

Other Soulidifly Productions products include SoulVision, a monthly e-magazine, and children's book publishing, including the Mr. Business: The Adventures of Little BK series.

More recently they signed a deal with GoMedia Productions.

Filmography

Films

References

External links
 
 

Film production companies of the United States
Mass media companies established in 2017